Leslie "Les" White (birth unknown) is a former professional rugby league footballer who played in the 1980s.

Playing career
White made his first grade debut for Penrith against Western Suburbs in round 21 1982 at Penrith Park.  In his time at the Penrith, the club failed to reach the finals.

In 1987, White joined Western Suburbs and made 16 appearances in his only seasons there as they finished last on the table.

In 1988, White signed with South Sydney and made four appearances in his time at Souths before departing the club after just one year.

References

Living people
Penrith Panthers players
Place of birth missing (living people)
South Sydney Rabbitohs players
Western Suburbs Magpies players
Year of birth missing (living people)
Rugby league props
Australian rugby league players